Emir Mkademi (born August 20, 1978) is a Tunisian football defender.

Career
Mkademi began his career at Etoile Sahel, where he won the CAF Cup in 1999, before moving to Espérance five years later during the summer of 2003. With Espérance Mkademi won the 2003 African Cup Winners' Cup before moving to Turkish side Akçaabat Sebatspor during the winter transfer window of the 2004/05 season, and then moving to FK Karvan in the Azerbaijan Premier League six months later. After six-months with Karvan Mkademi returned to Espérance before moving to Itesalat in Egypt during the summer of 2007.

International career
Mkademi was first called up to the Tunisian national team for their Africa Cup of Nations qualifier against Gabon in June 2001, and was an unused sub in all three of Tunisia' 2002 FIFA World Cup games.

Azerbaijan Career statistics

Honours

Club
 ES Sahel
CAF Cup
Winner (1): 1999

 Espérance
African Cup Winners' Cup
Winner (1): 2003

References

External links

1978 births
Living people
Tunisian footballers
2002 FIFA World Cup players
Tunisia international footballers
Étoile Sportive du Sahel players
Espérance Sportive de Tunis players
Akçaabat Sebatspor footballers
FK Karvan players
CA Bizertin players
2002 African Cup of Nations players
Expatriate footballers in Turkey
Expatriate footballers in Azerbaijan
Expatriate footballers in Egypt
Footballers from Tunis
Association football midfielders